Highway 302 (AR 302, Ark. 302, and Hwy. 302) is a designation for three east–west state highways in the Arkansas Grand Prairie. All three are low traffic rural highways. The first segment was created in 1963, with the other two added ten years later. One segment was part of the Trail of Tears and is preserved as an Arkansas Heritage Trail. All are maintained by the Arkansas Department of Transportation (ArDOT).

Route description

Rural Prairie County
Highway 302 begins at Highway 86 in western Prairie County, a flat agricultural county in the Arkansas Delta. It runs due east as a section line road through agricultural fields, bridging Mitchell Branch and Mellon Branch and passing rural residences and outbuildings. Continuing east, the highway crosses an overflow branch of Barnes Creek before intersecting Highway 249. Highway 302 terminates at this junction, with Highway 249 continuing east and south.

Cache River

Highway 302 begins at Highway 33 in eastern Prairie County south of DeValls Bluff, one of the dual county seats. Though beginning in an agricultural area, the highway quickly enters the dense forests associated with the riparian buffer of the Cache River. State maintenance ends at an intersection with County Road 222 and Old Petty Lane near the Cache River National Wildlife Refuge, with the roadway continuing east as County Road 218.

Monroe County

A third section of Highway 302 begins in Clarendon, the small-town county seat of Monroe County where the Cache River meets the White River. The route begins at US Highway 79 Business (US 79B, Madison Street) east of downtown near the St. Louis & San Francisco Railway tracks. Highway 302 runs north as 9th Street, passing the Clarendon High School and Harding Field, the Clarendon Lions high school football field. The highway turns north, exiting Clarendon and heading northward toward Brinkley, roughly paralleling the Cache River through sparsely populated agricultural lands. Shortly after passing through the unincorporated community of Dobbs Landing, Highway 302 intersects Highway 241. Highway 302 continues northward through Allendale to an intersection with Highway 17 just south of US 70, where it terminates.

History
Highway 302 was created by the Arkansas State Highway Commission (ASHC) on April 24, 1963, east from Highway 33.

In 1973, the Arkansas General Assembly passed Act 9 of 1973. As a result of this legislation, the other two segments were created: in Prairie County and between Highway 241 and Highway 17 in Monroe County. The Monroe County segment later replaced Highway 241 south to Clarendon on January 26, 1977, to improve route continuity.

The segment between Clarendon and Highway 17 was part of the Trail of Tears, and is designated as an Arkansas Heritage Trail.

Major intersections

See also

References

Sources

External links

Arkansas Heritage Trails System
302
Transportation in Monroe County, Arkansas
Transportation in Prairie County, Arkansas